Have Harmony, Will Travel is an album by singer and songwriter Carla Olson. It was released by Busted Flat Records on April 30, 2013 and marked Olson's first studio album since her 2001 release The Ring of Truth (in between, she and her band, the Textones, had produced Detroit 85: Live and Unreleased, a live album released in 2008).

Overview
Carla Olson desire to cut a duet record had been in development for several decades. In an interview with journalist Mike Ragogna she stated:
Several years ago, I was in between production projects, which is what I mainly do. I haven't done a studio album in a long time, mainly because I've been working at producing. One day I just thought, "Well, I'm in between projects. Maybe I should try to start something." I approached a couple of people about doing a duet album, one of them being Peter Case, who I’ve known since the '70s, and he said, "Yeah, I’d love to."

Olson then rounded up a host of her friends and bandmates as well as some of her favorite singers. Among these were Juice Newton, who duets with Olson in "You Can Come Cryin' to Me", the album's opening track, and "Stringin' Me On".  Olson and Peter Case team on the Del Shannon tune "Keep Searchin' (We'll Follow the Sun)" and on Moby Grape's "8:05".  Initially, Olson was to have performed "8:05" with her recording partner, Gene Clark, but he died before the recording was made. "She Don't Care About Time", a song written by Clark, was performed with Richie Furay.

In his review of the album music critic Thom Jurek stated:
Though there isn't a weak cut in bunch, there are some soaring highlights It ends the set by seamlessly melding folk, rock, and country. Have Harmony, Will Travel is a welcome return for Olson, but that's not all. With its direct, kinetic production, compelling song choices, and inspired performances, it is a blueprint for future duet recordings.

Track listing

Personnel

Carla Olson – acoustic and electric guitar, vocals
Peter Case – featured artist, acoustic, rhythm and electric guitar, vocals
Richie Furay – featured artist, vocals
James Intveld – featured artist, electric guitar, vocals
Scott Kempner – featured artist, rhythm guitar, vocals
Gary Myrick – featured artist
Juice Newton – primary artist, vocals
Rob Waller – featured artist, vocals
John York – 12-string guitar, acoustic guitar, vocals
Clem Burke – drums
Cindy Cashdollar – lap steel guitar
Mike Clinco – nylon string guitar
Skip Edwards – piano
Tom Fillman – drums
Barry Goldberg – Hammond B3, piano
Rick Hemmert – drums
Tony Marsico – bass
Tom Junior Morgan – saxophone
Richard Podolor – nylon string guitar, mandolin
Marty Rifkin – pedal steel guitar
Pat Robinson – bass, piano
Gregg Sutton – bass

References

2013 albums